The 2019–20 Tahiti Cup (also known as Coupe de Polynésie or Coupe Tahiti Nui) is the 81st edition of the national cup in Tahitian football. A.S. Vénus are the defending champions. The winner will earn the right to represent Tahiti in the 2020–21 Coupe de France, entering at the seventh round.

Teams
A total of 25 teams compete in the tournaments: ten teams from Tahiti Ligue 1, seven teams from Tahiti Ligue 2, six teams from Mo'orea, one team from Marquesas Islands and one team from Raiatea.

Teams from 2019–20 Tahiti Ligue 1
Central Sport
Dragon
Jeunes Tahitiens
Manu-Ura
Olympique de Mahina
Pirae
Taravao AC
Tefana
Tiare Tahiti
Vénus

Teams from 2019–20 Tahiti Ligue 2
Arue
Excelsior
Mataiea
Papara
Papenoo
Taiarapu
Tamarii Punaruu

Teams from Mo'orea
Mira
Tamarii Tapuhute
Temanava
Tiare Anani
Tiare Hinano
Tohie'a
Team from Marquesas Islands
Mahitoa
Team from Raiatea
Samine

The draw was held on 29 October 2019.

First round

Second round

Quarter-finals

The cup was suspended after the quarter-final stage due to the COVID-19 pandemic in French Polynesia. Initially it was decided to resume the competition in September 2020. However, on 27 May 2020 following new consultation with the clubs, the competition was cancelled, and Tiare Tahiti, who were at third place of the 2019–20 Tahiti Ligue 1 at the time of suspension, qualified for the 2020–21 Coupe de France seventh round as the representative of Tahiti, which would originally be awarded to the winners of the 2019–20 Tahiti Cup.

Top scorers

References

External links
2019–20 Tahiti Ligue 1

External links
Fédération Tahitienne de Football
Coupe de Polynésie, FTF

Tahiti Cup
Tahiti
Cup
Tahiti